Reginald L. Love (born April 29, 1981) is an American personal aide, former college basketball player, and media editor. Love served as the special assistant and personal aide, commonly referred to as body man, to U.S. President Barack Obama. Love left this position around the end of 2011 to complete his Master of Business Administration degree at the University of Pennsylvania's Wharton School. In July 2015, Vice Media announced that Love would become an editor-at-large for its sports site, Vice Sports.

Education
Love attended high school at Providence Day School in Charlotte, North Carolina.

He graduated with a degree in political science and public policy from Duke University. While at Duke, he was a two-sport athlete, playing both football and basketball. He played wide receiver for the Duke Blue Devils football team on a football scholarship. 

Love also played forward for the Duke Blue Devils basketball team. He was a walk-on as a freshman, and later became team captain as a senior. He played on the 2001 team that won the NCAA national championship.

Career

Obama Administration 
Love applied for an internship on Capitol Hill in 2006. He was interviewed by Robert Gibbs, Obama's communications director, for a position in Obama's Senate office. He was hired with the title of Deputy Political Director. He became Obama's personal assistant in 2007, during the 2008 presidential campaign.

As Obama's aide, his job was to anticipate any and all of Obama's needs. In reference to the myriad support duties Love performed, Obama referred to Love as his "iReggie", a play on Apple's iPad, humorously stating that "I have an iReggie, who has my books, my newspapers, my music all in one place". Love and Obama played basketball every day there was a primary during the 2008 presidential election, and they played regularly in the following years, always on the same side. Love and Obama's friends organised a game of basketball on the White House basketball court to celebrate Obama's 50th birthday. The game featured the NBA players Shane Battier, LeBron James, Magic Johnson, Maya Moore, Alonzo Mourning, Joakim Noah, Chris Paul and Derrick Rose in addition to Obama's friends from high school. Kobe Bryant and Bill Russell were spectators. Obama has described Love as his "little brother."

Post-White House 
Love left the White House Office to complete his MBA at Wharton School of the University of Pennsylvania in 2012. After graduation, he became a partner and vice president for RON Transatlantic Holdings.

Love authored a memoir, titled Power Forward: My Presidential Education, about his time working for President Obama. The book was released in February 2015.

In July 2015, Love became an editor-at-large for Vice Sports, in addition to his role at Vice Media.

In 2019, Love endorsed Pete Buttigieg in the 2020 Democratic Party presidential primaries.

References

External links

1981 births
African-American people
American football wide receivers
Basketball players from Charlotte, North Carolina
Duke Blue Devils football players
Duke Blue Devils men's basketball players
Living people
Obama administration personnel
Players of American football from Charlotte, North Carolina
American men's basketball players
American memoirists